Dorothée Normand-Cyrot is a French applied mathematician and control theorist, known for her work on discrete-time nonlinear control systems.

Education and career
As a teenager entering the French university system in 1971, Normand-Cyrot found the grandes écoles closed off to her because she was female; instead she went to a lesser university to study mathematics. Her mentors included algebraist Andrée Ehresmann and, a few years later, control theorist Michel Fliess.

Normand-Cyrot worked for two years for Électricité de France, earned a doctorat de troisième cycle in mathematics in 1978 at Paris Diderot University, became a researcher for the French National Centre for Scientific Research (CNRS) in 1981, and completed her doctorat d'état in 1983 at Paris-Sud University. She became a director of research for CNRS in 1991, and was posted by CNRS to the Laboratoire des signaux et systèmes at Paris-Saclay University.

Recognition
Normand-Cyrot was named an IEEE Fellow in 2005, "for contributions to discrete-time and digital nonlinear control systems".

References

External links

Year of birth missing (living people)
Living people
French mathematicians
French women mathematicians
Control theorists
Fellow Members of the IEEE
Research directors of the French National Centre for Scientific Research